Below are the results of the third season of the Latin American Poker Tour (LAPT). All currency amounts are in US dollars.

Results

LAPT Playa Conchal 
 Casino: Ramada Plaza Herradura
 Buy-in: $2,500 +$200
 4-Day Event: November 19–22, 2009
 Number of buy-ins: 259
 Total Prize Pool: $628,075
 Number of Payouts: 40

LAPT Punta del Este 
 Casino: Mantra Resort Spa Casino
 Buy-in: $3,700
 4-Day Event: February 24–27, 2010
 Number of buy-ins: 307
 Total Prize Pool: $1,042,260
 Number of Payouts: 48

LAPT Lima 

 Casino: Atlantic City Casino
 Buy-in: $2,500 +$200
 4-Day Event: June 2–5, 2010
 Number of buy-ins: 384
 Total Prize Pool: $931,200
 Number of Payouts: 48

LAPT Florianópolis 
 Casino:
 Buy-in: $2,500 +$200 (R$5,000)
 4-Day Event: August 5–8, 2010
 Number of buy-ins: 356
 Total Prize Pool: $995,996 (R$1,624,200)
 Number of Payouts: 48

LAPT Rosario Grand Final
 Casino: City Center Casino, Rosario
 Buy-in: $4,700 +$300
 5-Day Event: September 22–26, 2010
 Number of buy-ins: 254
 Total Prize Pool: $1,176,200
 Number of Payouts: 40

References 

Latin American Poker Tour
2009 in poker
2010 in poker